The 2012 Cedar Rapids Titans season was the first for the indoor American football team that played its inaugural season in the Indoor Football League (IFL). The team played their home games at the Cedar Rapids Ice Arena located in Cedar Rapids, Iowa.

In August 2011, it was announced that the Cedar Rapids Titans would become an expansion team of the Indoor Football League for the 2012 season. Titans' General Manager Chris Kolalis stated, "We believe that Cedar Rapids is a fantastic market to bring a team into. We hope to promote economic development and be a part of the growth of the community by being active and giving back to the fans." The team also announced that they would play their home games at the Cedar Rapids Ice Arena, with the intentions to play in the newly renovated, U.S. Cellular Center in 2013.

On November 18, 2011, the Titans hired former NFL player, Kyle Moore-Brown, as the first coach in franchise history. They won their inaugural game on March 3, 2012 with a 32-13 win over Lehigh Valley Steelhawks.

Regular season

Roster

References

External links
Cedar Rapids Titans official website

Cedar Rapids River Kings
Cedar Rapids
2012 in sports in Iowa